The Al-Rahma Mosque is a mosque located on Hatherley Street in Toxteth, Liverpool, England, which can accommodate between 2,000 and 2,500 people and serves as the main place of worship and focus point for Liverpool's Muslim population, estimated at 25,000 people.

Background
The Liverpool Muslim Society, founded in 1953 by the late Al-Haj Ali Hizzam, a member of Liverpool's Muslim Community, and originally operated from a room in his house, is based at the mosque.

The current mosque was built in 1974, having taken 10 years to get approval from the city's planning department.

Today
The current building is used primarily by the city's Yemenis, Syrians, and Somali populations who constitute the vast majority of Liverpool's Muslim population.

See also
List of mosques in the United Kingdom
Liverpool Muslim Institute
Abdullah Quilliam

References

External links

Al-Rahma Mosque - Official Website
Liverpool Muslim Society

Mosques in England
Buildings and structures in Liverpool
Mosque buildings with domes
Sunni Islam in the United Kingdom
Mosques completed in 1974
1974 establishments in England
Religion in Liverpool